John Philip Monahan (born 1932) is a retired major general in the United States Marine Corps who served as commanding general of I Marine Expeditionary Force.

References

1932 births
Living people
United States Marine Corps generals